Statistics of Ekstraklasa for the 1999–2000 season.

Overview
A total of 16 teams competed in the 1999–2000 season. Polonia Warsaw won the championship.

League table

Results

Top goalscorers

References

External links
 Poland – List of final tables at RSSSF 

Ekstraklasa seasons
Poland
1999–2000 in Polish football